The Dorchester South Burying Ground is a historic graveyard on Dorchester Avenue in the Dorchester neighborhood of Boston, Massachusetts.  Established in 1814, it is the second oldest cemetery in Dorchester, after the North Burying Ground.  It is a roughly  parcel on the west side of Dorchester Avenue, north of Dorchester Lower Mills.  A paved roadway provides circulation around the perimeter of the property.  There is some evidence that the cemetery was formally terraced, due to the sloping terrain, but there is no evidence of curbing that might have been used for this purpose.  One of the cemetery's most prominent features is a line of granite tombs along the southern boundary.

The cemetery was listed on the National Register of Historic Places in 2014.

See also
 List of cemeteries in Boston, Massachusetts
 National Register of Historic Places listings in southern Boston, Massachusetts

References

External links
 

Cemeteries in Dorchester, Boston
Historic districts in Suffolk County, Massachusetts
Dorchester, Boston
National Register of Historic Places in Boston
Historic districts on the National Register of Historic Places in Massachusetts